Bradley Crouch (born 14 January 1994) is a professional Australian rules footballer playing for the St Kilda Football Club in the Australian Football League (AFL). He was recruited by the Adelaide Football Club with the second selection in the 2011 mini-draft. He is the older brother and former teammate of Matt Crouch. Crouch and his family are from Beaufort, near Ballarat in Victoria.

AFL career

Early Adelaide career 
Playing for Vic Country in the 2011 AFL Under 18 Championships, Crouch was named in the Under-18 All-Australian side as a half-back flanker. After this, he was drafted a year earlier than usual under the 2011 mini-draft rules, and was not permitted to play in 2012. Instead, he played for West Adelaide in the SANFL. However, he did get special clearance from the AFL to play one pre-season game for Adelaide against the Brisbane Lions in Alice Springs. During the season he injured his hamstring and missed out on two months of football.

Despite playing a major role in the 2013 pre-season, Crouch did not play in the Crows' first game for the season. After struggling with hamstring injuries early in the season, he played the last 10 games in succession, immediately establishing himself as one of the club's premier midfielders, and winning an AFL Rising Star nomination in round 14 after a breakout performance against  which included 31 possessions and a game-high 6 tackles. He finished second in the Rising Star award to Hawthorn player Jaeger O'Meara, and also won Adelaide's Emerging Talent Award. At the end of 2013, Crouch signed a three-year contract extension, keeping him at the Crows until the end of 2016, and his brother Matt Crouch was drafted in the 2013 AFL draft to join him at the club.

Crouch continued to struggle with injury over the next couple of years. In 2014 he suffered a fractured leg in the round two Showdown, which allowed his brother Matt Crouch to make his debut the next week. The two brothers played together at senior level for the first time in the SANFL for the Crows' reserves side in Round 9 when Crouch had recovered from his latest injury. He returned to the AFL side in Round 15, coincidentally for the next Showdown, and went on to play the final nine games of the year, before a foot injury prevented him from playing a game in 2015.

2016 
Even worse for Crouch in the pre-season, he was dropped to the reserves before the season had even begun for disciplinary reasons. He was able to make his way into the senior side for the first round and played well, but he was pulled from the side in Round 3 due to hamstring soreness. This injury forced him to stay out of the side for two weeks before he returned to the reserves side with an impressive 36 possessions and 10 clearances. His form improved over the next month in the reserves and he forced his way back into the side in Round 14. He again recaptured his best form towards the end of the season, playing the final 12 games during which he averaged 25 disposals. Despite speculation during the season that Crouch would reject new contract offers from Adelaide and ask for a trade to another club, he accepted a four-year extension worth approximately $2.4 million towards the end of the season, keeping him at the club until 2020.

2017 and grand final appearance 

Crouch suffered a hamstring injury in 2017 that ruled him out of the entire pre-season and put him in doubt for round 1 of the regular season. He played in the SANFL for the first few rounds of the season due to concerns that he would struggle in the AFL after missing a large amount of the pre-season. His SANFL form, 40 and 31 disposals in back to back games, warranted his return to the AFL side in Round 5 against the Gold Coast Suns, where he amassed 22 disposals to half time and 33 for the match in a 67-point win. His form continued to improve, as did his brother's. In the Crows' Round 18 match against , Crouch fractured his cheekbone in the third quarter, but fought through the pain and played out the rest of the match. He had to have surgery and missed out on the next game. In the final round of the home and away season in the last AFL game ever played at Subiaco Oval, Crouch and his brother needed a combined 60 disposals to break a record for the most disposals in an AFL season by brothers, previously held by Kane Cornes and Chad Cornes from cross-town rivals . By half-time, they already had 50 disposals between them. They passed the Cornes brothers late in the third quarter and had a total of 87 disposals by the end of the match, making the new record 1,202 disposals. He finished the season playing in the 2017 AFL Grand Final against , which the Crows lost by 48 points.

2019–2020 
After missing the entire 2018 season with a groin injury, Crouch went on to become one of seven Crows to play all 22 games in 2019. He averaged 30 disposals a game and won the Malcolm Blight Medal as the Crows' best and fairest. Crouch received a season-high 18 of a possible 20 medal votes in Adelaide’s win over Richmond in Round 13, collecting a career-high 43 disposals, 11 clearances, six inside-50s and four rebound-50s. Crouch averaged a career-best 30.2 disposals (ranked eighth across the AFL home and away season) and finished second at the Club for clearances and tackles with totals of 117 and 111. The midfielder also made 86 inside-50s - the most of any Crow that season - to go with 11 goals. He also collected 14 Brownlow votes, and received the maximum three votes in two games - Round 11 and Round 13. At the conclusion of the season, Crouch's management explored potential suitors at rival clubs which eventually culminated in a requested a trade to the Gold Coast Suns following interest from St Kilda and Geelong. Crouch sought a move to a club willing to pay a $5 million contract over five seasons. Late in the Trade Period Crouch approached the Suns and lowered his asking price in a bid to complete a trade. The Gold Coast board ultimately blocked the deal given the high draft pick cost of completing the trade and their commitment to securing the services of Matt Rowell and Noah Anderson in the upcoming draft.

Crouch played the first eight rounds of the shortened 2020 season before sustaining a hamstring injury. Crouch rejoined the side in round 15 and played the final four games of the season. In shortened 16-minute quarters and a 17-game season due to the Coronavirus Pandemic, Crouch averaged 22 disposals a game, collecting a season-high 31 disposals in the Crows' upset win over GWS in round 16. Crouch, along with former teammate Tyson Stengle was reprimanded in October 2020 for 'conduct unbecoming' after both were searched by South Australian Police on 28 September and found to be in possession of an illicit substance. The AFL elected to ban the pair for matches in 2021 (as the season had concluded) with Stengle banned for four matches and Crouch banned for two. The conduct of Stengle and Crouch’s constitutes a notifiable adverse finding under the AFL’s Illicit Drugs Policy.

St Kilda: 2021–present 

On 21 October, Crouch nominated St Kilda as his preferred destination during the Free Agency Period following a contract offer from the club. Crouch was a restricted free agent under AFL rules, meaning the Crows were able to match the contract offer from the Saints to force a trade. Crouch had also attracted interest from Geelong, Richmond and Port Adelaide, although it is understood that only the Saints were prepared to offer a five-year contract. On 1 November, the Saints lodged the paperwork for Crouch, with the Crows having three days to decide whether or not to match the bid. Crouch himself spoke publicly of his desire for the Crows not to match the bid, stating that "I want them to not match. I've told St Kilda I'm fully committed to them, so I want to see that out. At this stage I just want to be at St Kilda and the decision I've made I'm fully committed to them." He officially joined St Kilda on 4 November after Adelaide decided not to match at the deadline of 5 pm.  Adelaide received draft pick number 23 as compensation. On deciding on St Kilda, Crouch stated that “I think the main thing that attracted me to the Saints was the history. We haven’t won a flag in a long time and it would be pretty cool to be a part of that if we could get one over the line in the next few years. I think that really excited me in comparison to going to one of the teams that have been successful in the last five to 10 years and chasing the flag with them."

following his two-game suspension, Crouch made his debut for St Kilda in Round 3, 2021, against Essendon. He played his 100th AFL game in Round 7 against Hawthorn and had 32 disposals and 7 clearances. In round 12 against the Swans, Crouch had a prolific game collecting 38 disposals, 14 contested possessions, 7 clearances, 7 tackles and 12 score involvements. At the mid-point of the season, Crouch had strongly embedded himself in the Saints' best 22. Despite missing the first two games of the season, Crouch was second for St Kilda's disposals, centre clearances and contested possessions and third for effective disposals.  Between round 6 and 13, Crouch averaged 30 disposals a game. Against his former club Adelaide in round 13, Crouch had 36 disposals, 6 tackles, f5 clearances and 19 contested possessions, the second week in a row he had greater than 35 disposals. Crouch ultimately played 20 games (all consecutive), missing just the two opening rounds with suspension. He finished the season second for St Kilda’s total disposals (527), handballs (279), contested possessions (224), ground-ball gets (147), clearances (98), tackles (109) and effective disposals (345). He averaged 27 disposals, 5 clearances and 6 tackles per game. He finished equal fifth in the Saints' best and fairest, the Trevor Barker Award.

Statistics
 Statistics are correct to the end of the 2022 season

|-  
! scope="row" style="text-align:center" | 2013
| style="text-align:center" | 
| 2 || 14 || 4 || 5 || 158 || 185 || 343 || 61 || 62 || 0.3 || 0.4 || 11.3 || 13.2 || 24.5 || 4.4 || 4.4 || 6
|-
! scope="row" style="text-align:center" | 2014
| style="text-align:center" | 
| 2 || 11 || 5 || 6 || 125 || 147 || 272 || 26 || 61 || 0.5 || 0.5 || 11.4 || 13.4 || 24.7 || 2.4 || 5.5 || 0
|- 
! scope="row" style="text-align:center" | 2015
|
| 2 || 0 || — || — || — || — || — || — || — || — || — || — || — || — || — || — || — 
|-
! scope="row" style="text-align:center" | 2016
| style="text-align:center" | 
| 2 || 16 || 4 || 1 || 155 || 213 || 368 || 26 || 102 || 0.3 || 0.1 || 9.7 || 13.3 || 23.0 || 1.6 || 6.4 || 4
|-  
! scope="row" style="text-align:center" | 2017
| style=:text-align:center"|  
| 2 || 20 || 8 || 10 || 237 || 324 || 561 || 56 || 137 || 0.4 || 0.5 || 11.9 || 16.2 || 28.1 || 2.8 || 6.9 || 3
|-
! scope="row" style="text-align:center" | 2018
|
| 2 || 0 || — || — || — || — || — || — || — || — || — || — || — || — || — || — || — 
|-
! scope="row" style="text-align:center" | 2019
|
| 2 || 22 || 11 || 12 || 338 || 327 || 665 || 65 || 111 || 0.5 || 0.5 || 15.4 || 14.8 || 30.2 || 3.0 || 5.0 || 14
|-
! scope="row" style="text-align:center" | 2020
|
| 2 || 12 || 2 || 1 || 136 || 127 || 263 || 20 || 44 || 0.2 || 0.1 || 11.3 || 10.6 || 21.9 || 1.7 || 3.7 || 1
|- 
! scope="row" style="text-align:center" | 2021
|
| 5 || 20 || 7 || 5 || 248 || 279 || 527 || 56 || 109 || 0.4 || 0.3 || 12.4 || 14.0 || 26.4 || 2.8 || 5.5 || 5
|-
! scope="row" style="text-align:center" | 2022
|
| 5 || 21 || 7 || 3 || 270 || 301 || 571 || 73 || 149 || 0.3 || 0.1 || 12.8 || 14.3 || 27.1 || 3.4 || 7.0 || 10
|- class="sortbottom"
! colspan=3| Career
! 136
! 48
! 43
! 1667
! 1901
! 3568
! 382
! 775
! 0.3
! 0.3
! 12.2
! 13.9
! 26.2
! 2.8
! 5.6
! 43
|}

Notes

References

External links

1994 births
Living people
Adelaide Football Club players
Australian rules footballers from Victoria (Australia)
West Adelaide Football Club players
Greater Western Victoria Rebels players
Adelaide Football Club (SANFL) players
Malcolm Blight Medal winners
St Kilda Football Club players